Pixelh8 (pronounced "pixel hate") is the stage name for Matthew Applegate, a British chiptune composer, educator and screen actor.

Career

Music 
Pixelh8 combines the sounds of video games and electronic toys, often those that have been reverse engineered to avoid either copyright infringement or plagiarism to form original compositions, usually children's toys like Speak & Spells and Game Boys. Pixelh8 started off relatively unknown on Myspace and was widely discovered after winning a competition to open for Imogen Heap on her UK tour in 2006 and performing at Apple's iTunes Office in California.
Pixelh8 also won Sound on Sound.

Pixelh8 has also designed music software such as Music Tech for the Nintendo Game Boy and the Pro Performer for the Nintendo Game Boy Advance and Nintendo DS which turn both machines into real time synthesizers and is currently developing software for other machines. Pixelh8 Music Tech software has been mentioned several times by Imogen Heap and is said to be used in an upcoming track called Tidal.

Pixelh8 was the first headliner to the Nerdapalooza 2007 festival in California, other notable performances include performing for Huw Stephens on the BBC Introducing show December 2007 as well as Assembly 2008.

December 10, 2008 saw Pixelh8 perform at Maida Vale Studios for the BBC

January 23, 2009 The National Museum of Computing released a press statement  saying that Pixelh8 would be composing and performing an entirely new piece of music for the museum, using some of the "earliest and rarest" machines such as Colossus computer and the Elliott 803 entitled "Obsolete?".

April 15, 2009 Pixelh8 released Pixelh8 Music Tech V2.0, Pro Performer, Drum Tech and Death Ray software free for download from his official website.

May 25, 2009 Pixelh8 provided BBC Radio 1 and BBC Radio 1Xtra with some of the backing tracks for their Big Gaming Weekend.

May 26, 2009 Pixelh8 re-wrote the theme tune for BBC World Service's Digital Planet the special version of the theme tune was made available from The Open University.

Pixelh8's music has also been featured on and done interviews with BBC Radio 1 Rob Da Bank, Zane Lowe and Huw Stephens'  shows, BBC Radio 6 Tom Robinsons, Nemones  and Music Weeks  shows, BBC Radio 4, BBC Radio 1 Wales, BBC Radio Foyle, BBC Radio Suffolk, BBC Radio Three Counties, BBC Radio Norfolk, and on BBC News 24 E24, Ipswich Community Radio's Martin & Lewis Show, BBC Look East and BBC South Today.

Education

Academic Research 
In 2011 Pixelh8 became a publsihed author with his research into chiptune instruments, his first article "Cultural perceptions, ownership and interaction with re-purposed musical instruments" was published in the Journal of Music, Technology & Education, Volume 3, Issue 2-3, 2011. His follow up research "Re-designing the familiar: How effective are directional control pads in developing musicianship in 8 – 12 year old children?" became Chapter 7 in the 2016 "Music, Technology, and Education Critical Perspectives" published by Routledge. Pixelh8 has also been heavily featured and interviewed in a number of academic texts including Pamela Burnard' s "Musical Creativities in Practice" Chapter 8 "Interactive audio design"  published by Oxford University Press and Kenneth B. McAlpine's 2018 "Bits and Pieces A History of Chiptunes".

Teaching 
In 2012 Pixelh8 retrired from music to set up an Alternative Provision technology school  in Ipswich, Suffolk for 8 to 16-year-olds. The school has gone from success to success with the school winning an the Generation Code Hub of the Year 2018 award from Microsoft through UK Youth  and Pixelh8 (now Matthew C. Applegate) winning the Young Game Designer Mentor Award in 2019 from British Academy of Film and Television Arts.

Film 
In 2022 Matthew C. Applegate featured in a Telugu cinema film as a priest  from director Praveen Sattaru provisionally titled "VT12" for release in 2023.

References

External links
 Official Creative Computing Club Website
 Pixelh8's Twitter
 Pixelh8 Myspace page
 Playback: Pixelh8 - The Boy With The Digital Heart, Sound on Sound, March 2008

See also
 Chip Tune

Living people
Video game composers
Year of birth missing (living people)